Mujhay Vida Kar is a Pakistani television family soap series aired on ARY Digital from 17 May 2021 to 3 August 2021. It is produced by Abdullah Seja under IDream Entertainment. It stars Muneeb Butt, Madiha Imam and Saboor Aly in lead roles.

Cast
Saboor Aly as Sadia
Madiha Imam as Rida
Muneeb Butt as Usman
Shabbir Jan as Habib
Saba Hamid as Sultana
Haris Waheed as Aneeq
Raza Talish as Safeer
Sana Askari as Farheen
Ali Rizvi as Tauseef
Paras Masroor as Iqbal
Mariam Ansari as Masooma
Maira Khan as Kashifa
Shaista Jabeen

References

Pakistani television series
2021 Pakistani television series debuts
2021 Pakistani television series endings